The HIV trans-activation response (TAR) element is an RNA element which is known to be required for the trans-activation of the viral promoter and for virus replication. The TAR hairpin is a dynamic structure that acts as a binding site for the Tat protein, and this interaction stimulates the activity of the long terminal repeat promoter.

Further analysis has shown that TAR is a pre-microRNA that produces mature microRNAs from both strands of the TAR stem-loop.
These miRNAs are thought to prevent infected cells from undergoing apoptosis by downregulating the genes ERCC1, IER3, CDK9, and Bim.

Human polyomavirus 2 (JC virus) contains a TAR-homologous sequence in its late promoter that is responsive to HIV-1 derived Tat.

References

External links 
 
 miRBase page for hiv1-mir-TAR

MicroRNA
Cis-regulatory RNA elements